The Japanese destroyer {{nihongo|Yūzuki|夕月|”Evening Moon”}} was the last of twelve s built for the Imperial Japanese Navy (IJN) during the 1920s. During the Pacific War, she participated in the Battle of Guam in December 1941 and the occupations of New Guinea and the Solomon Islands in early 1942.

Design and description
The Mutsuki class was an improved version of the s and was the first with triple  torpedo tubes. They were powered by two Parsons geared steam turbines, each driving one propeller shaft, using steam provided by four Kampon water-tube boilers. Their crew consisted of 150 officers and crewmen.

The main armament of the Mutsuki-class ships consisted of four  Type 3 guns in single mounts; one gun forward of the superstructure, one between the two funnels and the last pair back to back atop the aft superstructure. The guns were numbered '1' to '4' from front to rear. The ships carried two above-water triple sets of 61-centimeter torpedo tubes; one mount was between the forward superstructure and the forward gun and the other was between the aft funnel and aft superstructure. Four reload torpedoes were provided for the tubes. They carried 18 depth charges and could also carry 16 mines. They could also fitted with minesweeping gear.

During Yūzukis December 1943–January 1944 refit, Nos. 2 and 4 guns were removed in exchange for additional license-built  Type 96 light AA guns and at least two  Type 93 anti-aircraft machineguns were installed abreast the bridge. In May–June, at Type 13 radar was installed, four 13.2 mm guns were removed and six more 25 mm guns were added.

Construction and career
Yūzuki, built at the Fujinagata Shipyards in Osaka, was laid down on 27 November 1926, launched on 4 March 1927 and completed on 25 July 1927. Originally commissioned simply as Destroyer No. 34, the ship was assigned the name Yūzuki on 1 August 1928. In the late 1930s, she participated in combat during the Second Sino-Japanese War, covering the landings of Japanese troops in central and southern China, and the Invasion of French Indochina.

Pacific War
At the time of the attack on Pearl Harbor, Yūzuki was assigned to Destroyer Division 23 under the Second Carrier Division of the 1st Air Fleet. She sortied from Hahajima in the Ogasawara Islands as part of the Japanese invasion force for the invasion of Guam. She returned to Truk in early January 1942 to join the invasion force for Operation R covering landings of Japanese forces at Kavieng, New Ireland on 23 January, and returning to Truk one month later. In March, Yūzuki assisted in covering landings of Japanese forces in the northern Solomon Islands, Lae and Admiralty Islands. The ship was reassigned to the 4th Fleet on 10 April.

During the invasion of Tulagi on 3–4 May 1942, Yūzuki was strafed in an air attack, which killed 10 crewmen, including her captain, Lieutenant Commander Hirota Tachibana, and injured 20 more. After the sinking of her sister ship , she became the flagship of Destroyer Division 30.

After repairs at Sasebo Naval Arsenal later that month, Yūzuki was assigned to Destroyer Division 29 in June and remained flagship of the division. The ship was initially based at Truk, and assigned to escort convoys carrying airfield construction crews from Truk to Bougainville and Guadalcanal, and patrols around Rabaul until the end of August. On 31 August, Yūzuki helped screen the Nauru and Ocean Island invasion force during Operation RY, and patrolled in the central Pacific to the end of the year.

After maintenance at Sasebo in January 1943, Yūzuki returned to Truk in February and resumed her patrols in the central Pacific to November 1943, on numerous occasions rescuing crews of torpedoed transports. On 30 November, Yuzuki was reassigned to Destroyer Division 30 of Destroyer Squadron 3, of the 8th Fleet and returned to Rabaul on 17 February 1944. In February, Yūzuki led the final Tokyo Express transport runs to New Britain and the final evacuation of Rabaul. From the end of February to May, Yūzuki was based at Palau and assisted in rescuing the survivors of the torpedoed light cruiser  on 27 April. From 1 May, Yūzuki was reassigned to the Central Pacific Area Fleet and on 18 July, directly to the Combined Fleet. In September and October, Yūzuki escorted convoys from the Japanese home islands to Taiwan, and escorted the aircraft carrier  to Brunei and Manila. On 21 November, Yūzuki was reassigned to the 5th Fleet.

The survivors were rescued by the destroyer . Yūzuki was struck from the Navy List on 10 January 1945.

Notes

References

External links
Mutsuki-class destroyers on Materials of the Imperial Japanese Navy

Mutsuki-class destroyers
1927 ships
Second Sino-Japanese War naval ships of Japan
World War II destroyers of Japan
Destroyers sunk by aircraft
World War II shipwrecks in the Pacific Ocean
Shipwrecks in the Visayan Sea
Maritime incidents in December 1944
Ships sunk by US aircraft
Ships built by Fujinagata Shipyards